Elisabeth Lovrek (born 31 December 1958) is an Austrian jurist and lawyer, serving as the President of the Supreme Court of Justice since July 2018. She previously was one of the court's Vice Presidents.

References 

Austrian jurists
Living people
1958 births